Code page 866 (CCSID 866) (CP 866, "DOS Cyrillic Russian") is a code page used under DOS and OS/2 in Russia to write Cyrillic script. It is based on the "alternative code page" developed in 1984 in IHNA AS USSR and published in 1986 by a research group at the Academy of Science of the USSR. The code page was widely used during the DOS era because it preserves all of the pseudographic symbols of code page 437 (unlike the "Main code page" or Code page 855) and maintains alphabetic order (although non-contiguously) of Cyrillic letters (unlike KOI8-R). Initially, this encoding was only available in the Russian version of MS-DOS 4.01 (1990) and since MS-DOS 6.22 in any language version.

The WHATWG Encoding Standard, which specifies the character encodings permitted in HTML5 which compliant browsers must support, includes Code page 866. It is the only single-byte encoding listed which is not named as an ISO 8859 part, Mac OS specific encoding, Microsoft Windows specific encoding (Windows-874 or Windows-125x) or KOI-8 variant. Authors of new pages and the designers of new protocols are instructed to use UTF-8 instead.

Not identical, but two very similar encodings are standardised in GOST R 34.303-92 as KOI-8 N1 and KOI-8 N2 (not  to be confused with the original KOI-8).

Character set 
Each character is shown with its equivalent Unicode code point. Only the second half of the table (code points 128–255) is shown, the first half (code points 0–127) being the same as code page 437.

Variants 
There existed a few variants of the code page, but the differences were mostly in the last 16 code points (240–255).

Alternative code page 
The original version of the code page by Bryabrin et al. (1986) is called the "Alternative code page", to distinguish it from the "Main code page" by the same authors. It supports only Russian and Bulgarian. It is mostly the same as code page 866, except for codes F2hex through F7hex (which code page 866 changes to Ukrainian and Belarusian letters) and codes F8hex through FBhex (where code page 866 matches code page 437 instead). The differing row is shown below.

Modified code page 866 
An unofficial variant with code points 240–255 identical to code page 437. However, the letter Ёё is usually placed at 240 and 241. This version supports only Russian and Bulgarian. The differing row is shown below.

Lithuanian variants

KBL 
The KBL code page, unofficially known as Code page 771, is the earliest DOS character encoding for Lithuanian. It mostly matches code page 866 and the Alternative code page, but replaces the last row and some block characters with letters from the Lithuanian alphabet not otherwise present in ASCII. The Russian Ё/ё is not supported, similarly to KOI-7.

A modified version, Code page 773, which replaces the Cyrillic letters with Latvian and Estonian letters, also exists.

LST 1284 
Lithuanian Standard LST 1284:1993, known as Code page 1119 or unofficially as Code page 772, mostly matches the "modified" Code page 866, except for the addition of quotation marks in the last row and the replacement of the mixed single-double box-drawing characters with Lithuanian letters (compare code page 850). Unlike KBL, the Russian Ё/ё is retained.

It accompanies LST 1283 (Code page 774/1118), which encodes the additional Lithuanian letters at the same locations as LST 1284, but is based on Code page 437 instead. It was later superseded by LST 1590-1 (Code page 775), which encodes these Lithuanian letters in the same locations, but does not include Cyrillic letters, replacing them with Latvian and Estonian letters.

Ukrainian and Belarusian variants 
Ukrainian standard RST 2018-91 is designated by IBM as Code page 1125 (CCSID 1125), abbreviated CP1125, and also known as CP866U, CP866NAV or RUSCII. It matches the original Alternative code page for all points except for F2hex through F9hex inclusive, which are replaced with Ukrainian letters. Code page/CCSID 1131 matches code page 866 for all points except for F8hex, F9hex, and FChex through FEhex inclusive, which are replaced with otherwise-missing Ukrainian and Belarusian letters, in the process displacing the bullet character (∙) from F9hex to FEhex. The differing rows are shown below.

Euro sign updates 
IBM code page/CCSID 808 is a variant of code page/CCSID 866; with the euro sign (€, U+20AC) in position FDhex, replacing the universal currency sign (¤).

IBM code page/CCSID 848 is a variant of code page/CCSID 1125 with the euro sign at FDhex, replacing ¤.

IBM code page/CCSID 849 is a variant of code page/CCSID 1131 with the euro sign at FBhex, replacing ¤.

GOST R 34.303-92 
The GOST R 34.303-92 standard defines two variants. The more extensive variant, KOI-8 N2 (but not to be confused with the KOI-8 encoding, which it does not follow), matches code page 866 and the Alternative code page until the last row (codes 240 through 255, or F0hex through FFhex). For the last row, it supports letters for Belarusian and Ukrainian in addition to Russian, but in a layout unrelated to code page 866 or 1125. Notably, even the Russian Ё/ё (which was unchanged between the Alternative code page and code page 866) is in a different location. The differing row is shown below.

The other variant, KOI-8 N1, is a subset of KOI-8 N2 which omits the non-Russian Cyrillic letters and mixed single/double lined box-drawing characters, leaving them empty for further internationalization (compare with code page 850). The affected rows are shown below.

Lehner–Czech modification 
An unofficial modification used in software developed by Michael Lehner and Peter R. Czech. It replaces three mathematic symbols with guillemets and the section sign which are commonly used in the Russian language. (Lehner and Czech created a number of alternative character sets for other European languages as well, including one based on CWI-2 for Hungarian, a Kamenicky-based one for Czech and Slovak, a Mazovia variant for Polish and a seemingly-unique encoding for Lithuanian. The modified row is shown below.

Latvian variant 
A Latvian variant, supported by Star printers and FreeDOS, is code page 3012. This encoding is nicknamed "RusLat".

FreeDOS 
FreeDOS provides additional unofficial extensions of code page 866 for various non-Slavic languages:
 30002 – Cyrillic Tajik
 30008 – Cyrillic Abkhaz and Ossetian
 30010 – Cyrillic Gagauz and Moldovan
 30011 – Cyrillic Russian Southern District (Kalmyk, Karachay-Balkar, Ossetian, North Caucasian)
 30012 – Cyrillic Russian Siberian and Far Eastern Districts (Altai, Buryat, Khakas, Tuvan, Yakut, Tungusic, Paleo-Siberian)
 30013 – Cyrillic Volga District – Turkic languages (Bashkir, Chuvash, Tatar)
 30014 – Cyrillic Volga District – Finno-Ugric languages (Mari, Udmurt)
 30015 – Cyrillic Khanty
 30016 – Cyrillic Mansi
 30017 – Cyrillic Northwestern District (Cyrillic Nenets, Latin Karelian, Latin Veps)
 30018 – Latin Tatar and Cyrillic Russian
 30019 – Latin Chechen and Cyrillic Russian
 58152 – Cyrillic Kazakh with euro
 58210 – Cyrillic Azeri
 59234 – Cyrillic Tatar
 60258 – Latin Azeri and Cyrillic Russian
 62306 – Cyrillic Uzbek

Code page 900 
Before Microsoft's final code page for Russian MS-DOS 4.01 was registered with IBM by Franz Rau of Microsoft as CP866 in January 1990, draft versions of it developed by Yuri Starikov (Юрий Стариков) of Dialogue were still called code page 900 internally. While the documentation was corrected to reflect the new name before the release of the product, sketches of earlier draft versions still named code page 900 and without Ukrainian and Belarusian letters, which had been added in autumn 1989, were published in the Russian press in 1990. Code page 900 slipped through into the distribution of the Russian MS-DOS 5.0 LCD.CPI codepage information file.

Notes

References

Further reading 
 

866